Jozo is a Croatian masculine given name, cognate to Josip and in turn Joseph.

It may refer to:

 Jozo Alebić
 Jozo Bogdanović
 Jozo Brkić
 Jozo Kljaković
 Jozo Križanović
 Jozo Matovac
 Jozo Matošić
 Jozo Pavič
 Jozo Penava
 Jozo Radoš
 Jozo Raz
 Jozo Šimunović
 Jozo Špikić
 Jozo Stanić
 Jozo Tomašević
 Jozo Zovko

Croatian masculine given names